Monte Linas is a massif in the province of South Sardinia, in south-western Sardinia, Italy. It is mostly composed of granite, and includes numerous mineral deposits, such as zinc and lead. Peaks include Perda de sa Mesa (1,236 m), the highest peak in southern Sardinia, Monte Lisone (1,082 m), punta di San Miali (1,062 m), punta Magusu (1,023 m).

External links
Forests of Monte Linas at SardegnaForeste 
 

Linas